In the United States, habitual offender laws (commonly referred to as three-strikes laws) have been implemented since at least 1952, and are part of the United States Justice Department's Anti-Violence Strategy. These laws require a person who is convicted of an offense and who has one or two other previous serious convictions to serve a mandatory life sentence in prison, with or without parole depending on the jurisdiction. The purpose of the laws is to drastically increase the punishment of those who continue to commit offenses after being convicted of one or two serious crimes.

Twenty-eight states have some form of a "three-strikes" law. A person accused under such laws is referred to in a few states (notably Connecticut and Kansas) as a "persistent offender", while Missouri uses the unique term "prior and persistent offender". In most jurisdictions, only crimes at the felony level qualify as serious offenses. And it may turn on which felonies are defined as being serious, which may vary depending on the jurisdiction, in particular, whether a subject felony must include violence or not.

The three-strikes law significantly increases the prison sentences of persons convicted of a felony who have been previously convicted of two or more violent crimes or serious felonies, and limits the ability of these offenders to receive a punishment other than a life sentence.

The expression "Three strikes and you are out" is derived from baseball, where a batter against whom three strikes are recorded strikes out.

History
The practice of imposing longer prison sentences on repeat offenders (versus first-time offenders who commit the same crime) is present throughout most of American history, as judges often take into consideration prior offenses when sentencing. However, there is a more recent history of mandatory prison sentences for repeat offenders. For example, New York State had a long-standing Persistent Felony Offender law dating back to the early 20th century (partially ruled unconstitutional in 2010, but reaffirmed en banc shortly after). But such sentences were not compulsory in each case, and judges had much more discretion as to what term of incarceration should be imposed.

During Prohibition the state of Michigan enacted one of the harshest laws against bootlegging in the nation. The law required a life sentence for those violating liquor laws for the fourth time. In late 1928 Etta Mae Miller, a mother of four was found guilty under this law, sparking outrage.

The first true "three-strikes" law was passed in 1993, when Washington voters approved Initiative 593. California passed its own in 1994, when their voters passed Proposition 184 by an overwhelming majority, with 72% in favor and 28% against. The initiative proposed to the voters had the title of Three Strikes and You're Out, referring to de facto life imprisonment after being convicted of three violent or serious felonies which are listed under California Penal Code section 1192.7.

The concept swiftly spread to other states, but none of them chose to adopt a law as sweeping as California's. By 2004, twenty-six states and the federal government had laws that satisfy the general criteria for designation as "three-strikes" statutes—namely, that a third felony conviction brings a sentence of 20 to life where 20 years must be served before becoming parole eligible. A 1997 study found that in California, "the three-strikes law did not decrease serious crime or petty theft rates below the level expected on the basis of preexisting trends."

Three-strikes laws have been cited as an example of the McDonaldization of punishment, in which the focus of criminological and penological interest has shifted away from retribution and treatment tailored to the individual offender and toward the control of high-risk groups based on aggregations and statistical averages. A three-strikes system achieves uniformity in punishment of criminals in a certain class (viz., three-time offenders) in a way that is analogous to how a fast food restaurant achieves uniformity of its product.

Enactment by states

The following states have enacted three-strikes laws:
New York has employed a habitual felon statute since 1797.
North Carolina has had a law dealing with habitual felons since 1967, but the law was amended in 1994 and now means that a third conviction for any violent felony (which includes any Class A, B, C, D or E Felony) will result in a mandatory sentence of life imprisonment without parole. 
Maryland has had a habitual felon statute for violent offenders since 1975. The law was amended in 1994, meaning that a fourth conviction for a crime of violence mandates a sentence of life imprisonment without parole. 
Alabama has had a habitual felon statute for serious and violent felons since 1977, providing for up to life imprisonment, and includes a mandatory life sentence without parole for three or more felony convictions for any crime and one of those convictions were for any offense classified as a Class A Felony (10–99 years or life). 
Delaware has had a three-strikes law providing up to life imprisonment for serious felonies since 1973, when the Delaware Criminal Code, contained under Part I, Title 11 of the Delaware Code, became effective. 
Texas has had a three-strikes with mandatory life sentence since at least 1952.
In Rummel v. Estelle (1980), the US Supreme Court upheld Texas's statute, which arose from a case involving a refusal to repay $120.75 paid for air conditioning repair that was, depending on the source cited, either considered unsatisfactory or not performed at all, where the defendant had been convicted of two prior felony convictions, and where the total amount involved from all three felonies was around $230.
In 1993: Washington
In 1994: California, Colorado, Connecticut, Indiana, Kansas, Maryland, New Mexico, North Carolina, Virginia, Louisiana, Wisconsin, and Tennessee. Tennessee is one of the few states, together with Georgia and South Carolina, that mandates life without parole for two or more convictions for the most serious violent crimes, including murder, rape, aggravated cases of robbery, sexual abuse or child sexual abuse, etc. 
California's original Proposition 184 was later modified by 2012 California Proposition 36. In 2003, a sentence under the law was upheld in Ewing v. California. 
In 1995: Arkansas, Florida, Montana, Nevada, New Jersey, North Dakota, Pennsylvania, Utah, Georgia and Vermont. Georgia has a "two strikes" law, also known as the "seven deadly sins" law, which mandates a sentence of life imprisonment without parole for two or more convictions of murder, rape, armed robbery, kidnapping, aggravated sexual battery, aggravated sodomy, or aggravated child molestation or any combination of those offenses.
In 1996: South Carolina. South Carolina also has a "two strikes" law for crimes known as a "most serious offense", which are crimes like murder, rape, attempted murder, armed robbery, etc. whereas, the "three strikes" law applies to "serious offenses" which are many drug offenses, other violent crimes like burglary, robbery, arson, etc. and even serious nonviolent crimes like insurance fraud, forgery, counterfeit, etc. Two convictions or three convictions under these provisions or any combination of these will automatically result in a sentence of life in prison without the possibility of parole. The South Carolina "two strikes" law is similar to Georgia's seven-deadly-sins law. 
In 2006: Arizona
In 2012: Massachusetts

Georgia, South Carolina and Tennessee are the only states in the United States to date that have "two strikes" laws for the most serious violent crimes, such as murder, rape, serious cases of robbery, etc. and they all mandate a sentence of life imprisonment without parole for a conviction of any such crimes a second time around.

Application

The exact application of the three-strikes laws varies considerably from state to state, but the laws call for life sentences for at least 25 years on their third strike. In the state of Maryland, any person who receives their fourth strike for any crime of violence will automatically be sentenced to life imprisonment without parole.

Most states require one or more of the three felony convictions to be for violent crimes in order for the mandatory sentence to be pronounced. Crimes that fall under the category of "violent" include: murder, kidnapping, sexual abuse, rape, aggravated robbery, and aggravated assault.

Some states include additional, lesser offenses that one would not normally see as violent. For example, the list of crimes that count as serious or violent in the state of California is much longer than that of other states, and consists of many lesser offenses that include: firearm violations, burglary, simple robbery, arson, and providing hard drugs to a minor, and drug possession. As another example, Texas does not require any of the three felony convictions to be violent, but specifically excludes certain "state jail felonies" from being counted for enhancement purposes.

One application of a three-strikes law was the Leonardo Andrade case in California in 2009. In this case, Leandro Andrade attempted to rob $153 in videotapes from two San Bernardino K-Mart stores. He was charged under California's three-strikes law because of his criminal history concerning drugs and other burglaries. Because of his past criminal records, he was sentenced to 50 years in prison with no parole after this last burglary of K-Mart. Although this sentencing was disputed by Erwin Chemerinsky, who represented Andrade, as cruel and unusual punishment under the 8th Amendment, the Supreme Court ruled in support for the life sentencing.

In 1995, Sioux City, Iowa native Tommy Lee Farmer, a professional criminal who had served 43 years in prison for murder and armed robbery was the first person in the United States to be convicted under the federal three-strikes law when he was sentenced to life in prison for an attempted robbery at an eastern Iowa convenience store. He was prosecuted by Stephen J. Rapp, a US Attorney appointed by Clinton. The sentencing was considered so significant that President Bill Clinton interrupted a vacation to make a press statement about it.

Another example of the three-strikes law involves Timothy L. Tyler who, in 1992 at age 24, was sentenced to life in prison without parole when his third conviction (a federal offense) triggered the federal three-strikes law, even though his two prior convictions were not considered violent, and neither conviction resulted in any prison time served.

Effects

United States

Analyzing the effect of the Three-Strikes legislation as a means of deterrence and incapacitation, a 2004 study found that the Three-Strikes Law did not have a very significant effect on deterrence of crime, but also that this ineffectiveness may be due to the diminishing marginal returns associated with having pre-existing repeat offender laws in place.

Another study found that arrest rates in California were up to 20% lower for the group of offenders convicted of two-strike eligible offenses, compared to those convicted of one-strike eligible offenses. The study concluded that the three-strikes policy was deterring recidivists from committing crimes. California has seen a reduction in criminal activity, and "Stolzenberg and D’Alessio found that serious crime in California’s 10 largest cities collectively had dropped 15% during the 3-year post-intervention period".

A study written by Robert Parker, director of the Presley Center for Crime and Justice Studies at UC Riverside, states that violent crime began falling almost two years before California's three-strikes law was enacted in 1994. The study argues that the decrease in crime is linked to lower alcohol consumption and lower rates of unemployment.

A 2007 study from the Vera Institute of Justice in New York examined the effectiveness of incapacitation under all forms of sentencing. The study estimated that if US incarceration rates were increased by 10 percent, the crime rate would decrease by at least 2 percent. However, this action would be extremely costly to implement.

Another study found that three-strikes laws discourage criminals from committing misdemeanors for fear of a life prison sentence. Although this deters crime and contributes to lower crime rates, the laws may possibly push previously convicted criminals to commit more serious offenses. The study's author argues that this is so because under such laws, felons realize that they could face a long jail sentence for their next crime regardless of type, and therefore they have little to lose by committing serious crimes rather than minor offenses. Through these findings, the study weighs both the pros and cons for the law.

A 2015 study found that three-strikes laws were associated with a 33% increase in the risk of fatal assaults on law enforcement officers.

New Zealand
In 2010, New Zealand enacted a similar three-strikes law called the Sentencing and Parole Reform Act 2010. The bill was sponsored by Police and Corrections Minister Judith Collins from the ruling National Party. It was passed into law by the National and ACT parties but was opposed by the opposition Labour and Green parties, and National's support partner, the Māori Party. While the Sentencing and Parole Act was supported by conservative groups such as the Sensible Sentencing Trust, critics attacked the law for promoting penal populism and disproportionately targeting the Māori community.

In early June 2018, an attempt by the Labour-led coalition government to overturn the Sentencing and Parole Act was blocked by Labour's support partner New Zealand First and the opposition National and ACT parties. NZ First had indicated its opposition to overturning the three-strikes bill, prompting Justice Minister Andrew Little to abandon the attempt. 

On 11 November 2021, the Minister of Justice Kris Faafoi announced that the Government was introducing legislation to repeal the Sentencing and Parole Reform Act. On 9 August 2022, the New Zealand Parliament passed the Three Strikes Legislation Repeal Bill, which repealed the Sentencing and Parole Reform Act. The repeal legislation was supported by the Labour, Green, and Māori parties but was opposed by the National and ACT parties, who stated that they would reinstate three-strikes legislation if re-elected in 2023.

Criticism
Some criticisms of three-strikes laws are that they clog the court system with defendants taking cases to trial in an attempt to avoid life sentences, and clog jails with defendants who must be detained while waiting for these trials because the likelihood of a life sentence makes them a flight risk. Life imprisonment is also an expensive correctional option, and potentially inefficient given that many prisoners serving these sentences are elderly and therefore both costly to provide health care services to and statistically at low risk of recidivism. Dependents of prisoners serving long sentences may also become burdensome on welfare services.

Prosecutors have also sometimes evaded the three-strikes laws by processing arrests as parole violations rather than new offenses, or by bringing misdemeanor charges when a felony charge would have been legally justified. Likewise, there is potential for witnesses to refuse to testify, and juries to refuse to convict, if they want to keep a defendant from receiving a life sentence; this can introduce disparities in punishments, defeating the goal of treating third-time offenders uniformly. Three-strikes laws have also been criticized for imposing disproportionate penalties and focusing too much on street crime rather than white-collar crime.

See also

 10-20-Life
 Armed Career Criminal Act
 Baumes law, 1926 four strike law
 Ricardo Cerna, a 47-year-old man who committed suicide in 2003 after being arrested for attempted murder, which would have been his third strike
 Deterrence
 First Step Act
 Habitual offender laws, a comparison of similar laws in several countries
 Habitual Criminals Act
 HADOPI law
 Incapacitation (penology)
 Indefinite prison sentence
 Mandatory sentencing
 One strike, you're out
 Prison-industrial complex
 Recidivism
 Stanford Law School Criminal Defense Clinic
 United States Federal Sentencing Guidelines

References

U.S. state criminal law
Sentencing (law)
California law